Évran (Gallo: Evran) is a commune in the Côtes-d'Armor department in the region of Brittany in northwestern France.

Population

The inhabitants of Évran are known in French as  évrannais.

Personalities
 Henri Pinault, Roman Catholic Bishop of Chengdu, died in Évran in 1987

See also
Communes of the Côtes-d'Armor department

References

External links

Communes of Côtes-d'Armor